Fətəli xan is a municipality in the Quba Rayon of Azerbaijan.  The municipality is named in honor of Azerbaijani prime minister Fatali Khan Khoyski.

References

Populated places in Quba District (Azerbaijan)